Kristian Peter Pless  (born 9 February 1981) is a former professional male tennis player from Denmark.

Tennis career

Juniors
Pless had an excellent junior career, winning the 1999 Australian Open Boys' Singles (defeated Mikhail Youzhny), and reaching the Boys' final at both Wimbledon (lost to Jürgen Melzer), and the US Open (lost to Jarkko Nieminen) the same year. He finished 1999 as the No. 1 ranked junior player in the world.

Pro tour
He turned professional in 1999, and on 28 January 2002, Kristian Pless reached his career-high ATP singles ranking of World No. 65. He has won tournaments at the Futures and Challenger levels, and has reached three semifinals on the ATP Tour. He suffered a serious shoulder injury in 2003, which after multiple surgery kept him out of competition for almost a year.

After returning from injury in 2004, he had dropped in the rankings to World No. 846 on 24 May. Subsequently, he has gradually climbed the rankings, and after successful performances at the Challenger level in autumn 2006, he entered the Top 100 again. In January 2007, he continued his good performances as he defeated World No. 8 David Nalbandian in three sets in the first round of Chennai Open. This was Pless' first win against a Top-10 ranked player.

In 2007 he also managed to take a set from tennis legend Roger Federer at their meeting in Dubai, but eventually Federer won the tie 7–6(2), 3–6, 6–3. It was first set Federer had lost that year after he had won the Australian Open without losing a single set.

In 2008 he reached two Challenger finals (in Izmir, Turkey  and Rimouski, Canada), but ended the year outside of Top 100. 2009 was his last year on tour.

Junior Grand Slam finals

Singles: 3 (1 title, 2 runner-ups)

Doubles: 2 (1 title, 1 runner-up)

ATP Challenger and ITF Futures finals

Singles: 20 (7–13)

Doubles: 7 (4–3)

Performance timeline

Singles

See also
List of Denmark Davis Cup team representatives

References

External links
 Personal blog 
 
 
 

1981 births
Living people
Australian Open (tennis) junior champions
Danish male tennis players
Sportspeople from Odense
Tennis players at the 2000 Summer Olympics
Grand Slam (tennis) champions in boys' singles
Grand Slam (tennis) champions in boys' doubles
Olympic tennis players of Denmark